Copelatus javanus is a species of diving beetle. It is part of the genus Copelatus in the subfamily Copelatinae of the family Dytiscidae. It was described by Régimbart in 1883.

References

javanus
Beetles described in 1883